Brda, which translates as hills from Serbo-Croatian, may refer to:

Places

Bosnia and Herzegovina
 Brda, Bugojno, a village in the municipality of Bugojno
 Brda, Donji Vakuf, a village in the municipality of Donji Vakuf
 Brda, Drvar, a village in the municipality of Drvar
 Brda, Konjic, a village in the municipality of Kalinovik
 Brda, Kupres, a village in the municipality of Kupres
 Brda, Olovo, a village in the municipality of Olovo
 Brda (Rogatica), a village in the municipality of Rogatica
 Brda (Srebrenik), a village in the municipality of Srebrenik
 Brda (Trnovo), a village in the municipality of Trnovo
 Brda, Vareš, a village in the municipality of Vareš
 Brda, Velika Kladuša, a village in the municipality of Velika Kladuša
 Donja Brda, a village in the municipality of Goražde
 Gornja Brda, a village in the municipality of Goražde
 Lohovska Brda, a village in the municipality of Bihać
 Obla Brda, a village in the municipality of Trnovo

Montenegro
 Brda (Montenegro), a region
 Brda, Pljevlja, a village in Pljevlja Municipality

Poland
 Brda, Pomeranian Voivodeship, a village
 Nowa Brda, a settlement in the Pomeranian Voivodeship
 Stara Brda, a settlement in the Pomeranian Voivodeship

Slovenia
 Babna Brda, a settlement in the Municipality of Šmarje pri Jelšah
 Brda, Radovljica, a settlement in the Municipality of Radovljica
 Brda, Slovenj Gradec, a settlement the Municipality of Slovenj Gradec
 Dolga Brda, a settlement in the Municipality of Prevalje
 Krajna Brda, a settlement in the Municipality of Sevnica
 Mala Brda, a village in the Municipality of Postojna
 Municipality of Brda, a municipality in the Slovenian Littoral region
 Velika Brda, a village in the Municipality of Postojna

Other uses
 Brda (river), a river in Poland
 Brda dialect, a Slovene dialect
 NK Brda, a Slovenian football club from Dobrovo
 Tribes of Brda, tribes from the region of Montenegro
 , hills in Serbia

See also
 Burda (disambiguation)